The 1985 PBA All-Filipino Conference Finals was the best-of-5 basketball championship series of the 1985 PBA All-Filipino Conference, and the conclusion of the conference playoffs. The Great Taste Coffee Makers and Shell Azodrin Bugbusters played for the 31st championship contested by the league.

The Great Taste Coffee Makers won their finals series against Shell Azodrin Bugbusters, three games to one, for their fourth straight PBA title.

Qualification

Series scoring summary

Games summary

Game 1

Ricardo Brown was taken out at 7:36 in the second period after he sustained a bad fall while going for a layup. The Coffee Makers dominated the first half despite the loss of Brown and took the fight out of the rallying Bugbusters midway in the final period with a 9–2 spurt to open a 91–80 lead, time down to five minutes.

Game 2

Manny Victorino shot a team-high 35 points but it was the presence of Ricardo Brown that led to the Coffee Makers' surge in the final period, Brown sparked an 11–2 blast to turn an 87–90 deficit to a 98–92 lead with 5:23 left. The bugbusters lapsed into series of errors as Great Taste went to pad its lead to 12 points at 111–99 with 42 seconds remaining. Bogs Adornado shot a conference-high 46 points for Shell but the Coffee Makers' defense held other bugbusters in check.

Game 3

Ricardo Brown missed what could have been a winning shot at the buzzer. In the last five seconds, Brown moved out of a double team by Bernie Fabiosa and Romy Ang and jumped at the left side of the key hole but the ball rimmed out as the buzzer sounded. The bugbusters almost let a won game slipped away, the Coffee Makers were behind by 10 points at halftime but came back with Brown hitting four three-point shots in the last nine minutes. Great Taste moved to within 102–103 on the last of Brown's triple and Willie Pearson intercepted a pass by Philip Cezar with 27 seconds to go.

Game 4

An explosive second quarter blitz by Great Taste opened up a 54–38 halftime advantage. Ricardo Brown, who shot 15 points in the second quarter alone, including three triples, spearheaded a decisive 23–5 splurge as the Coffee Makers took a 16-point lead at the break. The bugbusters never recovered from there as the lead of Great Taste balloon to as many as 30 points in the second half, the last at 110–80 and with the championship wrapped up, the Coffee Makers relaxed allowing the Bugbusters to score eleven straight points for the final count.

Rosters

Broadcast notes

References

Great Taste Coffee Makers games
Shell Turbo Chargers games
1985
1985 PBA season
PBA All-Filipino Conference Finals